Cratoferonia is a genus of beetles in the family Carabidae, containing the following species: The three species in this genus live on the east coast of Australia.

 Cratoferonia daccordii Garetto & Giachino, 2003
 Cratoferonia phylarchus (Sloane, 1900)
 Cratoferonia regalis (Castelnau, 1867)

References

Pterostichinae